is a 2019 drama film written and directed by Kōji Fukada. It was entered into numerous international film festivals, including Locarno, Toronto, New York and Rotterdam.

Plot
Home nurse Ichiko works for the Oishi family, where she is treated as a full member. In addition to nursing bedridden grandmother Tōko, she also helps daughters Motoko and Saki with their exams in her free time. One day, Saki, the younger sister, is abducted. When Saki is finally found by the police and the abductor turns out to be Ichiko's nephew, a media frenzy follows which slowly drives Ichiko into social isolation. Motoko, who over time has become a friend and confidante, first supports, but later denounces Ichiko, publicly giving away a secret from Ichiko's past which the trusting Ichiko had told her in private. Ichiko, forced to quit her job and left by her fiancé, develops a desire for revenge.

Cast
 Mariko Tsutsui as Ichiko
 Mikako Ichikawa as Motoko Oishi
 Miyu Ozawa as Saki Oishi
 Sōsuke Ikematsu as Kazumichi Yoneda
 Ren Sudo as Tatsuo Suzuki, Ichiko's nephew
 Mitsuru Fukikoshi as Kenji Tozuka
 Nahoko Kawasumi as Yōko Oishi, the mother
 Hisako Ōkata as Tōko Oishi, the grandmother
 Kentez Asaka as Reporter

References

External links
 
 

2019 films
2019 drama films
Films shot in Japan
French drama films
Japanese drama films
Films set in Chiba Prefecture
2010s French films
2010s Japanese films
2010s Japanese-language films